

Offseason

Recruiting

Regular season

Standings

Roster

2020-21 Nittany Lions

As of November 5, 2020.

Schedule

|-
!colspan=12 style="background:#0a2351; "| Regular Season

|-
!colspan=12 style="background:#0a2351; "| CHA Tournament

Awards and honors
Josie Buthon, 2020-21 USCHO.com Rookie of the Year
Kiara Zanon, 2020-21 Women's Hockey Commissioners Association National Rookie of the Year
Kiara Zanon, 2020-21 Second Team CCM/AHCA All-American

References

Penn State Nittany Lions
Penn State women's ice hockey seasons